The Primetime Emmy Award for Outstanding Guest Actress in a Drama Series is an award presented annually by the Academy of Television Arts & Sciences (ATAS). It is given in honor of an actress who has delivered an outstanding performance in a guest starring role on a television drama series for the primetime network season.

The award was first presented at the 27th Primetime Emmy Awards on May 19, 1975, to Zohra Lampert, for her performance on Kojak, and to Cloris Leachman, for her role on The Mary Tyler Moore Show. It has undergone several name changes, originally honoring single leading and supporting appearances in drama and comedy series through 1978. The award was re-introduced at the 38th Primetime Emmy Awards under the name Outstanding Guest Performer in a Drama Series, honoring actors and actresses in guest starring roles on television drama series. In 1989, the category was split into categories for each gender, resulting in the name change to its current title.

Since its inception, the award has been given to 35 actresses. Patricia Clarkson, Cherry Jones, Shirley Knight, Margo Martindale, Amanda Plummer, and Alfre Woodard have won the most awards in this category, with two each. Cicely Tyson has been nominated for the award on five occasions, the most in the category. Meanwhile, Law & Order: Special Victims Unit holds the most awardees, with 5 winners coming from the show.

Winners and nominations
Listed below are the winners of the award for each year, as well as the other nominees.

1970s

1980s

1990s

2000s

2010s

2020s

Performers with multiple wins

2 wins
 Patricia Clarkson
 Cherry Jones (consecutive)
 Shirley Knight
 Margo Martindale (consecutive)
 Amanda Plummer
 Alfre Woodard

Programs with multiple wins

5 wins
 Law & Order: Special Victims Unit (4 consecutive)

3 awards
 The Handmaid's Tale (consecutive) 
 The Practice (2 consecutive)

2 wins
 The Americans (consecutive)
 The Good Wife (consecutive)
 NYPD Blue 
 Six Feet Under

Performers with multiple nominations

5 nominations
 Cicely Tyson

4 nominations
 Shirley Knight
 Margo Martindale
 Diana Rigg 
 Alfre Woodard

3 nominations
 Alexis Bledel
 Ellen Burstyn 
 Kate Burton 
 Veronica Cartwright
 Laverne Cox 
 Joan Cusack
 Penny Fuller 
 Allison Janney
 Cherry Jones
 Swoosie Kurtz
 Cloris Leachman
 Kay Lenz
 Marlee Matlin
 Phylicia Rashad
 Jean Smart

2 nominations
 Kathy Baker
 Patricia Clarkson
 Colleen Dewhurst
 Loretta Devine
 Patty Duke
 Sally Field
 Louise Fletcher
 Jane Fonda
 Marcia Gay Harden
 Eileen Heckart
 Diane Ladd
 Mary McDonnell
 Jayne Meadows
 Martha Plimpton
 Amanda Plummer
 CCH Pounder
 Carrie Preston
 Lili Taylor
 Lily Tomlin
 Harriet Walter

Programs with multiple nominations

14 nominations
 Law & Order: Special Victims Unit

9 nominations
 Grey's Anatomy

8 nominations
 ER
 The Handmaid's Tale

6 nominations
 Six Feet Under
 St. Elsewhere

5 nominations
 The Americans
 Game of Thrones
 How to Get Away with Murder
 The Practice
 Road to Avonlea
 Succession

4 nominations
 Homicide: Life on the Street
 House of Cards
 Law & Order
 Mad Men
 NYPD Blue
 Touched by an Angel
 The X-Files

3 nominations
 Big Love
 China Beach
 The Good Wife
 Masters of Sex
 Orange Is the New Black
 Scandal
 Shameless
 thirtysomething
 This Is Us

2 nominations
 Cagney & Lacey
 Chicago Hope
 Fallen Angels
 Huff
 Joan of Arcadia
 L.A. Law
 Midnight Caller
 Moonlighting
 The Newsroom
 Nip/Tuck
 Picket Fences

See also
 TCA Award for Individual Achievement in Drama
 Critics' Choice Television Award for Best Guest Performer in a Drama Series
 Golden Globe Award for Best Supporting Actress – Series, Miniseries, or Television Film
 Screen Actors Guild Award for Outstanding Performance by a Female Actor in a Drama Series

References

Guest Actress - Comedy Series